Koon Woon is a Chinese-American poet, editor, student of mathematics, philosophy, and modal logic, and mentor based in Chinatown, Seattle, Washington. His poetry is internationally-anthologized.

Early life
Woon was born into a large family in a small village near Guangzhou, China, in 1949. Then, in 1960, he with his family immigrated to the United States.

Education
During the late 1960s to early 1970s, Woon attended the University of Washington, enrolled in courses in the Department of Mathematics and the Department of Philosophy. He then transferred to the University of Oregon, where John Wisdom was influential.

After recovering from mental illness lasting two decades, he went to Antioch University Seattle and got a bachelor's degree. Then, Woon attended Fort Hays State University and got a master's degree.

Literary work
Woon has published two books of poetry, and self-published two memoirs. He edits Chrysanthemum and Five Willows Literary Review.

Awards
He is winner of a Pen Oak / Josephine Miles Award and an American Book Award.

Publications
Woon, K. (1998). The Truth in Rented Rooms. Los Angeles: Kaya Press. 
Woon, K. (2013). Water Chasing Water. Los Angeles: Kaya Press. 
Woon, K. (2016). Paper-son Poet: When rails were young.... Seattle: Goldfish Press. 
Woon, K. (2018). Rice Bowls: Previously Uncollected Words of Koon Woon. Seattle: Goldfish Press.

References

1949 births
Living people
American male poets